Elhanan ben Isaac Jaffe of Dampierre (Hebrew: ר׳ אֶלְחָנָן בֶּן יִצְחָק יָפֶה מִדַּמְפְּיֵיר; d. 1184) also known as Rabbeinu Elhanan was a 12th-century French Tosafist and the son of Isaac ben Samuel. He is mostly known for his numerous commentaries on the Talmudic tractates, Avodah Zarah and Yoma among other notable commentaries. He is also the founder of the Jaffe family.

Biography 
Born in Dampierre, France, his father was the head of the Dampierre Yeshiva. Rabbi Elhanan had several illustrious pupils, such as Judah ben Isaac Messer Leon. His tosafot are numerous and were often quoted by contemporary scholars, and are mentioned in "Minḥat Yehudah", "Shibbole ha-Leḳeṭ" and Rambam's "Sefer Hafla'ah". He is also credited for two works of his own: "Tiḳḳun Tefillin" - a treatise on Tefillin, and several piyyutim related to passover. Rabbi Elhanan was martyred in 1184.

References 

Tosafists
12th-century French rabbis